Radikal jung – Das Festival junger Regisseure (Radical Young, the Festival for Young Directors) is an annual weeklong German theatre festival at the Münchner Volkstheater, Munich. It began in 2005 as a forum and stage for the next generation of directors.

A jury will select productions by young directors of German theater to stage. At the end of the festival week an audience prize of €2,500 is awarded. Parallel to the performances is a supporting program and public discussions with the directors and a member of the jury abouts the future of theater and new ways of funding.

Participants

2005 
 Thalia Theater Hamburg: Port, dir. David Bösch
 Deutsches Schauspielhaus Hamburg: Don Karlos, dir. Laurent Chétouane
 Burgtheater Wien: Untertagblues, dir. Friederike Heller
 Schauspiel Frankfurt: Jack und Jill, dir. Christiane Schneider
 Schauspiel Frankfurt: Dantons Tod, dir. Philipp Preuss
 Münchner Volkstheater: Was ihr wollt, dir. Jorinde Dröse
 Münchner Volkstheater: Fegefeuer in Ingolstadt, dir. Jorinde Dröse
 Münchner Volkstheater: Nieder Bayern, dir. Florian Fiedler

2006 
 Schauspiel Frankfurt: Die Leiden des jungen Werther, dir. Florian Fiedler (winner of the public prize)
 Staatstheater Stuttgart: Früchte des Nichts, dir. Roger Vontobel
 Schauspielhaus Bochum: Phaidras Liebe, dir. Lisa Nielebock
 Deutsches Schauspielhaus Hamburg: Lila/Purple, dir. Jens Zimmermann
 Münchner Volkstheater: Viel Lärm um nichts, dir. Jorinde Dröse
 Mädchenchor Giessen: Dreckig tanzen, dir. Susanne Zaun
 Schauspiel Essen: Ein Sommernachtstraum, dir. David Bösch (winner of the public prize)
 Thalia Theater Hamburg: Antigone, dir. Christine Eder

2007 
 Deutsches Nationaltheater Weimar: Othello, der Mohr von Venedig, dir. Tilmann Köhler
 Deutsches Theater Berlin: Waldstein oder der Tod des Walter Gieseking am 6. Juni 2005, dir. Hanna Rudolph (winner of the public prize)
 Schaubühne am Lehniner Platz: Augenlicht, dir. Ingo Berk
 Thalia Theater Hamburg: Viel Lärm um nichts, dir. David Bösch
 Münchner Volkstheater: Frühlings Erwachen, dir. Christine Eder
 Thalia Theater Hamburg: Finkenwerder Herbstprinzen oder wie die Äpfel fliegen lernten, dir. Frank Abt
 Deutsches Schauspielhaus Hamburg: Spieltrieb, dir. Roger Vontobel
 Schauspiel Essen: Bluthochzeit, dir. Rafael Sanchez
 Münchner Kammerspiele: Engel, dir. Felicitas Brucker

2008 
 Thalia Theater Hamburg: Gerettet, dir. Jette Steckel
 Theaterhaus Jena: Second life - "So real, wie Du dich fühlst", dir. Tomas Schweigen
 Münchner Volkstheater: Schilf, dir. Bettina Bruinier (winner of the public prize)
 Staatstheater Stuttgart: the kids are alright, dir. Seraina Maria Sievi
 Staatsschauspiel Dresden: Antigone, dir. Yael Ronen
 schauspielfrankfurt: Robinson Crusoe oder Friday, I´m in Love, dir. Robert Lehniger
 schauspielfrankfurt: Don Quijote, dir. Simon Solberg
 Deutsches Theater Berlin: Roberto Zucco, dir. Jakob  Fedler
 Schauspielhaus Graz: Alice, dir. Viktor Bodó

2009 
 Schauspiel Leipzig: Juli, dir. Mareike Mikat
 Deutsches Theater Berlin: Caligula, dir. Jette Steckel (winner of the public prize)
 Schaubühne Berlin: Die Räuber, dir. Lars Eidinger
 Thalia Theater Hamburg: Letztes Territorium, dir. Corinna Sommerhäuser
 Theaterakademie Hamburg: Ödipus, dir. Felix Rothenhäusler
 Maxim-Gorki-Theater Berlin: Glaube Liebe Hoffnung, dir. Ronny Jakubaschk
 Theater Erlangen: Die Reise, dir. Eike Hannemann
 Münchner Volkstheater: Faust, dir. Simon Solberg

2010 
 schauspielfrankfurt: Hedda Gabler, dir. Alice Buddeberg 
 Münchner Volkstheater: Romeo und Julia, dir. Simon Solberg
 Münchner Volkstheater: Eros, dir. Christine Eder
 Thalia Theater Hamburg: Amerika, dir. Bastian Kraft (winner of the public prize)
 Thalia Theater Hamburg: Ernst ist das Leben (Bunbury) dir. Anna Bergmann
 Maxim-Gorki-Theater Berlin: Der Geisterseher, dir. Antú Romero Nunes 
 Schauspiel Leipzig: Im Pelz, dir. Johannes Schmit 
 Schauspielhaus Bochum: Himmelangst, dir. Lilli-Hannah Hoepner

2011 
 Heimathafen Neukölln (Berlin): ArabQueen, dir. Nicole Oder (winner of the public prize)
 schauspielfrankfurt: Peer Gynt, dir. Antú Romero Nunes
 Kleines Theater "Duško Radovic" Belgrad: Gott ist ein DJ - Bog je di džej, dir. Miloš Lolić
 Schauspielhaus Zürich: Stiller, dir. Heike M. Goetz
 Burgtheater Wien: Dorian Gray, dir. Bastian Kraft
 Ballhaus Naunynstraße Berlin: Verrücktes Blut, dir. Nurkan Erpulat
 Münchner Volkstheater: Das fünfte Imperium, dir. Mareike Mikat
 Gate Theatre London/ATC: Fatherland, dir. Caroline Steinbeis
 Théâtre national de Belgique Brussels: Life: Reset, dir. Fabrice Murgia
 Centraltheater Leipzig: Vatermord, dir. Robert Borgmann

2012 
 Maxim-Gorki-Theater Berlin: Rocco und seine Brüder, dir. Antú Romero Nunes
 HOPPart Company Budapest: Korijolánusz, dir. Csaba Polgár
 International Institute of Political Murder: Hate Radio (UA), dir. Milo Rau
 Theaterhaus Jena: Faust, dir. Moritz Schönecker
 Staatsschauspiel Dresden: Tschick (UA), dir. Jan Gehler
 Het Huis van Bourgondië Maastricht: This is my dad (UA), dir. Ilay den Boer
 Münchner Volkstheater: Felix Krull, dir. Bastian Kraft
 schauspielfrankfurt: Der große Gatsby, dir. Christopher Rüping

2013 
 Schauspielhaus Zürich: Kinder der Sonne, dir. Daniela Löffner  
 Theater Bielefeld: Demut vor deinen Taten Baby (UA), dir. Babett Grube
 Thalia Theater (Hamburg): Die Protokolle von Toulouse (UA), dir. Malte C. Lachmann
 Stadttheater Klagenfurt: Winterreise, dir. Marco Štorman
 International Institute of Political Murder: Breiviks Erklärung, dir. Milo Rau
 O-Team mit dem Theaterhaus Jena: Ich bedanke mich für alles (UA), dir. Samuel Hof
 Home Made Ensemble Tel Aviv: Shall we dance (UA), dir. Abigail Rubin and Yoav Bartel
 Münchner Volkstheater: Arabboy, dir. Abdullah Kenan Karaca
 Schauspiel Köln: Die Glasmenagerie, dir. Sebastian Kreyer
 Tmuna Theater Tel Aviv: Mein Jerusalem - a performance by Sabine Sauber (UA), dir. Eyal Weiser

2014 
 Free production: This is the land - the zionist creation rejects' salon (UA), dir. Eyal Weiser 
 all exclusive productions/in-house festival: Life & Strive (UA), dir. and concept Anat Eisenberg and Mirko Winkel
 Free production: The Lottery (UA), dir. und Konzept Saar Székely and Keren Sheffi
 Maxim-Gorki-Theater: Schwimmen lernen, dir. Hakan Savaş Mican
 Schauspielhaus Zürich: Die Radiofamilie, dir. Mélanie Huber
 Teatru Spălătorie Chișinău: Dear Moldova, can we kiss just a little bit? (UA), dir. Jessica Glause
 Ballhaus Naunynstraße, Landestheater Niederösterreich and Maxim gorki Theater: Ich rufe meine Brüder, dir. Michael Ronen
 Unkoordinierte Bewegung: Austrian Psycho (UA)
 Münchner Volkstheater: Der große Gatsby, dir. Abdullah Kenan Karaca
 si vous pouviez lécher mon coeur with Festival d'Avignon et al.: les particules élémentaires, dir. Julien Gosselin
 Nationaltheater Mannheim and Hessische Theaterakademie: Hurenkinder Schusterjungen (UA), dir. Tarik Goetzke
 Schauspiel Frankfurt: 2. Sinfonie-Rausch (UA), dir. Ersan Mondtag

References
 Europäische Perspektiven, by Kilian Engels und C. Bernd Sucher.  (paperback)

Theatre festivals in Germany
Festivals in Munich